Roșia – Peșteana Coal Mine is an open-pit mining exploitation, one of the largest in Romania located in Rovinari, Gorj County. The legal entity managing the Roșia - Peșteana mine is the National Company of Lignite Oltenia which was set up in 1997.

The exploitation has three open pits Roșia, Peșteana Nord, Peșteana Sud-Urdar that produced 7.2 million tonnes of lignite in 2008. The mine has around 2,900 workers and is endowed with 19 bucket-wheel excavators, 12 spreaders, one mixed machine and three deposits spreader. The total proven recoverable reserves of the mine amount to 112 million tonnes of lignite.

References

Coal mines in Romania